Three Sisters is an American sitcom television series created by Eileen Heisler and DeAnn Heline, that aired on NBC for two seasons from January 9, 2001, to February 5, 2002.

Summary
Steven Keats narrates the story of his life with his wife, Bess, their new baby... and her two omnipresent neurotic sisters, and interfering parents. Plots revolved around the young couple's efforts to lead a normal life through Bess's family's craziness and her people-pleasing personality. Guest stars included Valerie Harper and Howard Hesseman as Steven's divorced parents, Merle and Jerry Keats.

Cast
 David Alan Basche as Steven Keats
 Katherine LaNasa as Bess Bernstein-Flynn Keats
 Vicki Lewis as Nora Bernstein-Flynn
 A.J. Langer as Annie Bernstein-Flynn
 Dyan Cannon as Honey Bernstein-Flynn
 Peter Bonerz as George Bernstein-Flynn
 Edward Kerr as Jasper 'Jake' Riley

Episodes

Season 1 (2001)

Season 2 (2001–02)

References

External links

NBC original programming
2001 American television series debuts
2002 American television series endings
2000s American sitcoms
English-language television shows
Television series by Universal Television
Television series about sisters